Bojan Beljić (Serbian Cyrillic: Бојан Бељић; born 8 May 1985) is a Serbian professional footballer who plays for Turbina Vreoci, as an attacking midfielder.

After starting out at Kolubara, Beljić went on to play for various clubs, most notably Jagodina, Sloboda Užice and Radnički Kragujevac.

Honours
Napredak Kruševac
Serbian First League: 2015–16

References

External links
 

Association football midfielders
Bojan Beljic
Expatriate footballers in Iran
Expatriate footballers in Thailand
FK Donji Srem players
FK Jagodina players
FK Kolubara players
FK Napredak Kruševac players
FK Radnički 1923 players
FK Sloboda Užice players
FK Jedinstvo Ub players
Serbian expatriate footballers
Serbian expatriate sportspeople in Iran
Serbian expatriate sportspeople in Thailand
Serbian footballers
Serbian First League players
Serbian SuperLiga players
Shahrdari Tabriz players
Bojan Beljic
1985 births
Living people